Sathyavani Muthu (15 February 1923 – 11 November 1999) was an Indian politician and an influential leader from Chennai, Tamil Nadu. She was a Member of the Legislative Assembly of Tamil Nadu, Rajya Sabha member and Union Minister. She began her political career as a member of Dravida Munnetra Kazhagam, began her own party, Thazhthapattor Munnetra Kazhagam and later joined the Anna Dravida Munnetra Kazhagam. In late 1990s, she again joined in DMK.

Member of Legislative assembly 
She was a member of Dravida Munnetra Kazhagam (DMK) since its beginning in 1949. In 1953, she was arrested for leading the DMK's protests against the Kula Kalvi Thittam. During 1959-58, she was the propaganda secretary of the party. She also served as the editor of the magazine Annai (lit. mother) She contested assembly elections from Perambur and Ulundurpet constituencies in all assembly elections between 1957 and 1977 and 1984. She won three times from Perambur constituency as an Independent candidate in 1957 election, as a Dravida Munnetra Kazhagam candidate in 1967, and 1971 elections. She lost the  1962 election from Perambur and 1977 election from Ulundurpet constituency.

Electoral history

Tamil Nadu minister 
She served as a minister for Harijan welfare and Information during C. N. Annadurai administration in Tamil Nadu from 1967 to 1969. She again served as a Harijan welfare minister in M. Karunanidhi administration till 1974.

Thazhthapattor Munnetra Kazhagam 
She resigned her ministerial position in 1974 and left Dravida Munnetra Kazhagam. She claimed that Harijans are not treated well by DMK since the death of C. N. Annadurai and the new leader M. Karunanidhi was prejudiced against harijans. She said

She formed Thazhthapattor Munnetra Kazhagam. The party was merged with Anna Dravida Munnetra Kazhagam after it came to power winning the 1977 election.

Union minister 
She served as a Rajya Sabha member as the All India Anna Dravida Munnetra Kazhagam representative from 3 April 1978 to 2 April 1984. She served as an Union Minister in Chaudhary Charan Singh ministry from 19 August 1979 to 23 December 1979. She along with A. Bala Pajanor were the first two non-Congress Dravidian parties Tamil Nadu politicians to serve in Union ministry.

Book 

Sathyavani Muthu penned her struggles in the book titled My Agitations, which was first released in 1982 by The Justice Press in Madras.

References 

Members of the Tamil Nadu Legislative Assembly
Dravida Munnetra Kazhagam politicians
Union Ministers from Tamil Nadu
1923 births
1999 deaths
Dalit politicians
20th-century Indian women politicians
20th-century Indian politicians
Dalit women
Women state cabinet ministers of India
Women union ministers of India
Women members of the Tamil Nadu Legislative Assembly